The Antwerp Open was a pro–am minor-ranking snooker tournament, which was part of the Players Tour Championship. The tournament started in 2011 and was staged at the Lotto Arena in Antwerp, Belgium. Mark Selby was the last champion.

Winners

See also
 2010 Brugge Open

References

External links

 
Recurring sporting events established in 2011
2011 establishments in Belgium
Recurring sporting events disestablished in 2013
2013 disestablishments in Belgium
Players Tour Championship
Snooker in Belgium
Snooker minor-ranking tournaments
Sports competitions in Antwerp
Defunct sports competitions in Belgium
Defunct snooker competitions